Modara Mehellage Don Pasanna Viraj Perera (born June 9, 1978, in Galle) is a Sri Lankan first class cricketer. An allrounder, he has made 2 first class hundreds and has taken over 100 wickets with his right-arm offbreak bowling.

External links
 
 

1978 births
Living people
Galle Cricket Club cricketers
Burgher Recreation Club cricketers
Sri Lankan cricketers
Cricketers from Galle
21st-century Sri Lankan people